Aykut Soyak (born 30 April 1995) is a German footballer who plays as a midfielder for Sportfreunde Siegen.

References

External links
 

1995 births
Sportspeople from Paderborn
Footballers from North Rhine-Westphalia
Living people
German footballers
Association football midfielders
SC Paderborn 07 players
SV Elversberg players
FC Viktoria 1889 Berlin players
1. FC Lokomotive Leipzig players
Rot Weiss Ahlen players
SC Wiedenbrück 2000 players
Sportfreunde Siegen players
3. Liga players
Regionalliga players
Oberliga (football) players